Sasha K. Gordon (born Oksana Tischenko) is a Ukrainian born actress residing in New York City. She is most noted for her performance in the 2015 film Natasha, for which she garnered a Canadian Screen Award nomination for Best Actress at the 5th Canadian Screen Awards in March 2017.

Early life 
Born and raised in Odessa, Ukraine, She moved to the United States at age 16.

Education 
Gordon studied marketing and finance at Fordham University, and acting at the Bruce Ornstein Acting Workshop.

Career 
Gordon is also a stage actress with the Wednesday Repertory Company in New York City, and performed in the off-Broadway play Terezin.

Sasha's favorite actors are Andrei Mironov, Philip Seymour Hoffman, Meryl Streep, Robert De Niro, and Ben Kingsley.

References

External links

 Official website
 Sasha K. Gordon on KinoPoisk

1989 births
Living people
Actors from Odesa
American film actresses
American stage actresses
Ukrainian emigrants to the United States
Fordham University alumni
21st-century American women